Inspired Cycle Engineering (ICE, ICE Recumbent Trikes) is a manufacturer of recumbent tricycles, based in Falmouth, Cornwall.

In 2013, ICE designed a custom-built trike called the Polar Cycle for Maria Leijerstam on her record-breaking ride to the South Pole. The design was based on a standard ICE SPRINT recumbent.

Models
As of December 2021, ICE's product lineup includes only tadpole trikes,

with two front wheels and one rear wheel.

 VTX 
 SPRINT X 
 SPRINT X TOUR
 ADVENTURE 
 ADVENTURE HD
 FULL FAT

See also
List of bicycle manufacturers

References

External links
 
 
 

Tricycles
Cycle manufacturers of the United Kingdom